Phallolysin is a Protein found the Amanita phalloides species of the Amanita genus of mushrooms, the species commonly known as the death cap mushroom. The protein is toxic and causes Cytolysis in many cells found in animals, and is noted for its Hemolytic properties.  It was one of the first toxins discovered in Amanita phalloides when the various toxins in the species where first being researched. The protein itself is observed to come in 3 variations, with observed differences in Isoelectric point.

History 
The toxic properties of death cap mushrooms have been known for most of recorded history, with historical accounts implicating it in the deaths of emperors. Attempts to isolate the toxic compounds began in the late 19th century, with the cytolytic elements of A. phalloides being isolated in 1891.

Physical properties 
Phallolysin has three variations, which differ in observed Isoelectric point. The variations have differences in the amino acids that make up the protein structure, with identical amounts of some amino acids while varying in others. They have near identical molecular weights of 34 kDa.

Effects on animal cells 
Phallolysin has been observed to have hemolytic properties toward a variety of animal cells, with it primarily being observed in mammals. The toxic effects are reduced at higher temperatures.

See also 

 Amanita phalloides
 Amanita
 Hemolysis
 Phallotoxin
 Amatoxin
 Virotoxins
 Phalloidin
 Antamanide

References 

Mycotoxins found in Basidiomycota
Proteins